Lobophytum hsiehi is a coral species of the genus Lobophytum found is shallow waters in the Indo-pacific.

References 

Alcyoniidae
Animals described in 1956